Bojan Mališić (born 14 January 1984) is a Serbian professional footballer who plays as a centre-back for Serbian club Sinđelić Beograd.

Career
Mališić started out at his hometown side Radnički Kragujevac, before moving to Rad in the summer of 2007. He spent three seasons with the Građevinari, before switching to Javor Ivanjica.

In early 2011, Mališić moved abroad to Uzbekistan and joined Nasaf Qarshi. He helped the club win the AFC Cup later that year.

In July 2012, Mališić signed with Ukrainian Premier League side Hoverla Uzhhorod. He made 23 league appearances and scored one goal in the 2012–13 season.

In 2014, Mališić returned to Asia and joined Hong Kong Premier League club South China. He moved to Philippines Football League side Davao Aguilas in 2017.

Ahead of the 2018 season, Mališić signed to play for Indonesian club Persib Bandung.

Honours

Club
Nasaf Qarshi
 AFC Cup: 2011

Individual
 Hong Kong Top Footballer Awards: Most Favourite Player (2014–15)
 Hong Kong Top Footballer Awards: Hong Kong Top Footballers (2014–15, 2015–16)
Liga 1: 2018 Best Goal

References

External links
 
 
 

Association football defenders
Davao Aguilas F.C. players
Expatriate footballers in Hong Kong
Expatriate footballers in Indonesia
Expatriate footballers in the Philippines
Expatriate footballers in Ukraine
Expatriate footballers in Uzbekistan
FC Hoverla Uzhhorod players
FC Nasaf players
FK Javor Ivanjica players
FK Rad players
FK Radnički 1923 players
Hong Kong First Division League players
Liga 1 (Indonesia) players
Persib Bandung players
Badak Lampung F.C. players
Serbia and Montenegro footballers
Serbian expatriate footballers
Serbian expatriate sportspeople in Hong Kong
Serbian expatriate sportspeople in Indonesia
Serbian expatriate sportspeople in the Philippines
Serbian expatriate sportspeople in Ukraine
Serbian expatriate sportspeople in Uzbekistan
Serbian First League players
Serbian footballers
Serbian SuperLiga players
South China AA players
Sportspeople from Kragujevac
Ukrainian Premier League players
Uzbekistan Super League players
1985 births
Living people
AFC Cup winning players